Shap Sze Heung, sometimes transliterated as Shap Sz Heung, is an area in Hong Kong located in the northern part of the Sai Kung Peninsula.

Administration
Despite its proximity to the neighbouring areas administered by Sha Tin and Sai Kung districts, Shap Sze Heung is actually administered by Tai Po District. It is covered by the Sai Kung North constituency of the Tai Po District Council, which is currently represented by Ben Tam Yi-pui.

Villages
Shap Sze Heung consists of 14 villages:
 Kei Ling Ha Lo Wai
 Kei Ling Ha San Wai
 Sai Keng
 Nga Yiu Tau
 Tin Liu aka. Tai Tung Wo Liu
 Tai Tung
 Tseng Tau
 Ma Kwu Lam
 Che Ha
 Kwun Hang
 Nai Chung
 Sai O
 Tseung Kwan Lei
 Cheung Muk Tau

Education
Shap Sze Heung is in Primary One Admission (POA) School Net 89. Within the school net are multiple aided schools (operated independently but funded with government money); no government schools are in the net.

See also

 Sai Sha Road
 Three Fathoms Cove
 Sai Kung North (constituency)

References

Populated places in Hong Kong
Tai Po District